Alexander Ivanovich Ertel (19 July 1855 – 7 February 1908) was a Russian novelist and short story writer.

Biography
Ertel was born near Voronezh, where his father – a soldier in Napoleon’s army, captured by the Russians – had settled and become an estate agent. He never completed school, and was largely self-educated. He published his first collection of stories called Notes from the Steppes in 1883. He was imprisoned in 1884 for his revolutionary ties, and afterwards exiled to Tver for four years. He published a number of novellas and stories in the 1880s and 1890s, including A Greedy Peasant (1886), and the two novels The Gardenins (1889), and Change (1891). When The Gardenins was republished in 1908, it featured a preface by Leo Tolstoy, who admired Ertel’s work.

After his death, his widow Marya Vasilievna lived in Moscow, taking in paying guests who had come to learn Russian; she was helped by their younger daughter, Elena (Lolya or Lola), who became a literary translator. Their elder daughter also became a literary translator, working in England as Natalie Duddington. Among Madame Ertel’s pupils was Bruce Lockhart; in his famous Memoirs of a British Agent (1932) he recorded that, thanks to her and Lolya, he became proficient in Russian, acquired a modicum of culture, and developed a deep affection for all things Russian. Marya died in the typhus epidemic in 1919; Lolya survived it and managed to escape to Britain in 1927.

Legacy 

His story The Specialist, and his novella A Greedy Peasant are available in English translation in Eight Great Russian Short Stories, A Premier Book, Fawcett Publications, 1962. The translator of these two works was his daughter Natalie Duddington, well known for her translations of other Russian authors.

English translations 
 Great Russian Short Stories, London, E. Benn Limited, 1929.
 Eight Great Russian Short Stories, A Premier Book, Fawcett Publications, 1962.

References 

1855 births
1908 deaths
Russian male short story writers
Novelists from the Russian Empire
Male writers from the Russian Empire
Writers from Voronezh
Russian people of German descent
19th-century novelists from the Russian Empire
19th-century short story writers from the Russian Empire
19th-century male writers from the Russian Empire
Prisoners of the Peter and Paul Fortress